Shock System was an independent rock band from Malaysia. Their music ranged from a mixture of metallic hardcore with rap-rock elements and soaring progressive rock bits. All of their recordings were released independently.

With the release of Peaceful Demonstration EP in 2003 and Stagnantation Disorder EP in 2005, they garnered attention and established themselves in the burgeoning Kuala Lumpur underground scene. They're also avid supporters of Food Not Bombs Kuala Lumpur.

Reviews

“Progressive in its collective vision, always working for something a bit different from the rest of the herd.” - Ricecooker Zine, Apr ‘06

“Definitely charged tracks for the thinking.” - Junk Magazine, Dec ‘06

“Interesting combination through creative riffs unifying a potentially powerful musical unit.” - ROTTW Magazine, June ‘07

“They certainly have something important to say, which amidst the meaningless tripe on record shelves these days, is worthy endeavour indeed.” - Channel V's AMP, June ‘07

“Sounds like Alice In Chains Unplugged!” - Azmyl Yunor on Shock System's acoustic set at the Troubaganger Show, May ’06

Discography
Peaceful Demonstration EP (2003, Independent:MALAYSIA)
Stagnantation Disorder EP (2005, Independent:MALAYSIA)
Deconstruct: The Discography (2012, Independent:MALAYSIA)

Appearances
Come Together compilation - various artists (2005, Independent:MALAYSIA)

External links
Review of Stagnantation Disorder EP
Shock System Bandcamp profile

Malaysian musical groups